Neil Everett Morfitt (born ) is an American sportscaster for ESPN. He is the co-anchor of the West Coast edition of SportsCenter alongside Stan Verrett.

Early life and education
Everett was born in Portland, Oregon and raised in Spokane, Washington. He was a varsity starter in football and basketball at Lewis and Clark High School, named to the all-city team in football at guard, and also played on the defensive line. He graduated in 1980. 

Everett attended Willamette University in Salem before transferring to the University of Oregon in Eugene and graduated in 1984. He was initiated as a member of Beta Theta Pi fraternity at Willamette and continued that membership at Oregon.

Career

Everett started out in broadcasting at KCST-FM in Florence on the central Oregon Coast, west of Eugene. He left the media field and moved to Hawaii, where he worked 15 years as an athletic administrator at Hawaii Pacific University. While still working full-time at HPU, Everett was hired at local ABC affiliate KITV, first as a news writer, then assignment editor, and finally as a sports anchor.

In April 1999, Everett interviewed with ESPN on the recommendation of a friend, but was not hired. The following year, ESPN called him for another audition, and this time he was hired as an anchor on ESPNews. In March 2009, he relocated to California to anchor the late-night Los Angeles edition of SportsCenter, which debuted on April 6, 2009.

Personal life
While he was a student at Oregon in 1983, Everett's mother Jackie, a high school teacher, died from cancer at age 45.
The use of his middle name as a professional surname is a tribute to his mother, a UO alumna and Astoria native, who would call him by his first and middle name when his behavior was less than optimal.

Everett's stepfather, Dave Robertson, was a longtime high school basketball coach at Shadle Park and won the state title in 1981,  led on the court by Mark Rypien. A math teacher, Robertson later coached at Gonzaga Prep.

References

External links
ESPN bio – Neil Everett
Athlete Promotions – speakers – Neil Everett
Beta Theta Pi Alumni Association – Neil Everett
Neil Everett interview for "The Beta Theta Pi" magazine

American television sports anchors
ESPN people
Journalists from Portland, Oregon
Willamette University alumni
University of Oregon alumni
People from Hawaii
Television anchors from Spokane, Washington
Living people
Year of birth missing (living people)